Kovacsia kovacsi, is a species of small air-breathing land snail, a terrestrial pulmonate gastropod mollusk in the family Hygromiidae, the hairy snails and their allies.

Distribution
This species occurs in Eastern Europe, in Hungary and in Romania.

References

 Varga, A. & Pintér, L. (1972). Zur Problematik der Gattung Hygromia Risso 1826. Folia Historico-Naturalia Musei Matraensis, 1: 121-129. Gyöngyös.
 ank, R. A.; Neubert, E. (2017). Checklist of the land and freshwater Gastropoda of Europe. Last update: July 16th, 2017

Kovacsia
Gastropods described in 1972